Virtua may refer to:

 in healthcare
 Virtua Health, a hospital and healthcare system in New Jersey.

 in video games
 Virtua Cop
 Virtua Fighter
 Virtua Racing
 Virtua Striker
 Virtua Tennis
 Virtual On